The canoeing competitions at the 1995 Pan American Games took place in Mar Del Plata, Argentina.

Medal table

Men's events

Women's events

References

1995
Events at the 1995 Pan American Games
1995 in canoeing